Rudolf (Rudi) Lehmann was a German-born Israeli sculptor and Wood carving artist. He was one of the pioneers of sculpture in the State of Israel.

Biography
Rudolf (Rudi) Lehmann (1903-1977), born in Berlin, August 25, 1903 to non-Jewish German Elizabeth Sender. In 1919 Rudolf was adopted by the Lehmann family.                                                                   
He was one of the pioneers of wood sculpting in the State of Israel.

Studies
In 1912 in Berlin he practiced, wood sculpture with Ludwig Vordermayer.
In 1917-1922, he studied mechanics and worked as a blacksmith's  apprentice. After studying woodcarving and sculpture with sculptor Harold Isenstein, he attended the :de:Kunsthochschule Berlin-Weißensee (Municipal Art School Berlin-Weißensee), majoring in sculpture and ceramics. During his studies there, he met Hedwig Grossman, whom he later married. In 1928-1930, Lehmann worked for Holzmann's Stone Mason and Carving company. He became a freelance stonemason and sculptor for museums around Germany, including the Pergamon Museum in Berlin, and worked in terra cotta at Hedwig's ceramics workshop. In the summer of 1933, Lehmann immigrated to Mandate Palestine with his wife and settled in Haifa. They established a ceramics testing laboratory at the Technion in  Haifa and settled on Kibbutz Yagur in 1935, where they established a flower pot factory.

In 1937, the couple opened a sculpture studio in Jerusalem, where Lehmann produced miniature carvings from olive wood, ivory, horn and gemstones sold as tourist souvenirs. In 1945-1947, Lehmann worked for the Haganah, building models and ballistic implements. In 1947-1948, he joined the Jewish Agency's Self-Defense Planning Committee.

In 1953, he helped to found the Ein Hod Artists' Village, where he taught sculpture. Among his students were Yigael Tumarkin and Menashe Kadishman. In 1959, Lehmann and his wife moved to Givatayim where he established an art school under the auspices of the Givatayim municipality. The school held classes in sculpture, woodcuts and ceramics for young people and adults.

Lehmann's work was influenced by the Canaanism school of Israeli art. which attempted to create a direct relationship with the Land of Israel by emphasizing simple shapes and motifs from the sculpture and ritual art of early Middle Eastern civilizations.

He died in 1977.

Awards and recognition
1933 Dizengoff Prize for Painting and Sculpture, Municipality of Tel Aviv-Yafo
1951 Dizengoff Prize for Painting and Sculpture, Tel Aviv Museum of Art, Municipality of Tel Aviv-Yafo
1953 Dizengoff Prize for Painting and Sculpture, Municipality of Tel Aviv-Yafo
1966 Dizengoff Prize for Painting and Sculpture, Municipality of Tel Aviv-Yafo

Education
1912 Academy of Berlin, Germany, wood sculpture with Vordermeyer
1917 Berlin, Germany, blacksmithing and metalworking
1922-24 woodcarving and sculpture with sculptor Harold Isenstein
1923 Municipal High School for Art, Berlin, Germany, sculpture and ceramics
1924-28 Modern Art School, Berlin, Germany, sculpture and ceramics

Teaching
1923-25 Art School, Berlin Municipality, Germany
1934 Bezalel Academy of Arts and Design, Jerusalem
1959 Studio in Givatayim, sculpture and ceramics

See also
Visual arts in Israel

References

External links
 
 
 

Jewish emigrants from Nazi Germany to Mandatory Palestine
German art educators
Israeli sculptors
1903 births
1977 deaths